Julie Hayden may refer to:

Julie Hayden (editor) (1938/39–1981), American short story writer and editor
Julie Hayden (teacher) (died 1874), American murder victim

See also
Julie Haydon